Ghodaghodi Tal is a Ramsar site in western Nepal. It was declared as a bird sanctuary in March 2022.

This Ramsar site consists of a system of around 13 large and shallow oxbow lakes and ponds with associated marshes and meadows. It is surrounded by tropical deciduous forest and some streams along the periphery, which are separated by hillocks.

Flora
The lake has record of 388 vascular plants: five ptredophytes, 253 dicots, and 130 monocots.

Fauna 
The forest and wetlands serve as a wildlife corridor between the Terai lowland and the Siwalik Hills. They support critically endangered and vulnerable species including Bengal tiger, smooth-coated otter, Eurasian otter, swamp deer, lesser adjutant stork, red-crowned roofed turtle and three-striped roofed turtle.

During a survey in February 2021, 26 mugger crocodiles were recorded in 18 lakes.

References

External links 
 The Ramsar Convention on Wetlands: The Annotated Ramsar List of Nepal

Lakes of Sudurpashchim Province
Ramsar sites in Nepal
Protected areas established in 2003